Plasmodium telfordi is a parasite of the genus Plasmodium.

Like all Plasmodium species P. telfordi has both vertebrate and insect hosts. The vertebrate hosts for this parasite are reptiles.

Description

Geographical occurrence 

This species is found in Venezuela.

Clinical features and host pathology 

This species infects the lizard Ameiva ameiva.

References 

Telford, S. R, Jr (1980) The saurian malarias of Venezuela: Plasmodium species from iguanid and teiid hosts. Int. J. Parasitol. 10(5/6): 365-374

telfordi